The Nagpuri is a breed of water buffalo originating in Maharashtra, India. It stands better amongst the breeds of buffaloes which combine the milk and drought qualities in a better proportion in adverse climatic conditions. It is a River type buffalo. It is a central Indian breed. The breed has many synonyms, such as "Berari", "Gaorani", "Puranthadi", "Varhadi", "Gaolavi", "Arvi", "Gaolaogan", "Gangauri", "Shahi" and "Chanda".

Origin
As the name applies Nagpuri buffalo is a versatile breed of the Vidarbha region of Maharashtra, India.  The animals of this breed are very well adapted to the harsh-semi-arid conditions of Vidarbha region.

Physiological and physical characteristics
Coat color is black. The breed is black with white patches on face, legs and tail tips. However, "Puranthadi" strain, one of the productive stain of nagpuri buffalo, is slightly brown in color. The horns are long, flat and curved, bending backward on each side of the neck nearly up to the shoulders with tips pointed mostly in upward direction. 
Average height of nagpuri buffalo is 145cm for male and 135cm for female and heart girth is 210 and 205cm for male and female respectively.

Rearing and production

The animals are maintained in semi-intensive management system. 
Male body weight average 525kg where female attains about 425kg. 
Buffaloes and heifers in this area are reared mainly for fat production. Average milk yield per lactation is 1039 kg ranging from 760-1500 kg with average milk fat of 8.25% ranging from 7.0-8.8%. Nagpuri can withstand extreme climatic conditions as high as 47º C even in respect of milk production and fertility.
Male animal are used for daught purposes but it works slow than bull Cattle).

References

Water buffalo breeds originating in India